This is the results breakdown of the Portuguese local elections, 2013 for the Municipal Councils held on 29 September 2013. The following tables show detailed results in each of the country's 18 districts and 2 autonomous regions and a table with the detailed results from the most populous cities in the  country.

National summary of votes and seats

|-
! rowspan="2" colspan=2 style="background-color:#E9E9E9" align=left|Parties
! rowspan="2" style="background-color:#E9E9E9" align=right|Votes
! rowspan="2" style="background-color:#E9E9E9" align=right|%
! rowspan="2" style="background-color:#E9E9E9" align=right|±pp swing
! rowspan="2" style="background-color:#E9E9E9" align=right|Candidacies
! colspan="2" style="background-color:#E9E9E9" align="center"|Councillors
! colspan="2" style="background-color:#E9E9E9" align="center"|Mayors
|- style="background-color:#E9E9E9"
! align="center"|#
! align="center"|±
! align="center"|#
! align="center"|±
|-
| 
|1,812,029||36.26||1.4||303||923||2||149||17
|-
| 
|834,455||16.70||6.3||201||531||135||86||31
|-
| 
|552,690||11.06||1.3||288||213||39||34||6
|-
|style="width: 10px" bgcolor=#FF9900 align="center" | 
|align=left|Social Democratic / People's Party
|379,110||7.59||2.1||73||154||3||16||3
|-
|style="width: 8px" bgcolor=gray align="center" |
|align=left|Independents
|344,531||6.89||2.8||94||112||45||13||6
|-
| 
|152,073||3.04||0.1||143||47||16||5||4
|-
| 
|120,982||2.42||0.6||109||8||1||0||1
|-
|style="width: 9px" bgcolor=#FF9900 align="center" | 
|align=left|PSD / CDS–PP / MPT
|100,437||2.01||2.0||6||11||2||0||0
|- 
|style="width: 9px" bgcolor=#FF9900 align="center" | 
|align=left|PSD / CDS–PP / PPM
|94,015||1.88||0.1||4||21||6||2||1
|- 
|style="width: 9px" bgcolor=#FF9900 align="center" | 
|align=left|PSD / PPM
|65,102||1.30||—||7||21||—||1||—
|-
|style="width: 9px" bgcolor=#FF9900 align="center" | 
|align=left|PSD / PPM / MPT
|43,312||0.87||—||7||7||—||0||—
|-
|style="width: 9px" bgcolor=#FF9900 align="center" | 
|align=left|PSD/ CDS–PP / MPT / PPM
|23,551||0.47||2.5||4||14||7||1||0
|-
| 
|23,276||0.47||0.3||27||0||0||0||0
|-
|style="width: 9px" bgcolor=#FF66FF align="center" |
|align=left|PS / BE / PND / MPT / PTP / PAN
|21,102||0.42||—||1||5||—||1||—
|-
|style="width: 9px" bgcolor=#FF9900 align="center" | 
|align=left|PSD / MPT / PPM
|19,804||0.40||—||4||4||—||0||—
|-
| 
|16,233||0.32||—||8||0||—||0||—
|-
|style="width: 8px" bgcolor=#0093DD align="center" |
|align=left|CDS–PP / MPT / PPM
|9,299||0.19||—||7||1||—||0||—
|-
|style="width: 9px" bgcolor=#FF9900 align="center" | 
|align=left|PSD/ CDS–PP / PPM / MPT 
|8,918||0.18||1.1||4||4||5||0||1
|- 
|style="width: 10px" bgcolor=#CC0033 align="center" | 
|align=left|Labour
|8,552||0.17||—||22||0||—||0||—
|-
| 
|6,660||0.13||0.1||8||2||0||0||0
|-
|style="width: 8px" bgcolor=#0093DD align="center" |
|align=left|People's Party / Social Democratic
|4,656||0.09||—||4||4||—||0||—
|-
|style="width: 8px" bgcolor=#005FAD align="center" |
|align=left|PPM / PND / PPV
|3,634||0.07||—||1||0||—||0||—
|-
| 
|3,002||0.06||0.1||6||0||0||0||0
|-
|style="width: 8px" bgcolor=#0093DD align="center" |
|align=left|People's Party / Earth Party 
|2,931||0.06||0.1||3||0||0||0||0
|-
|style="width: 9px" bgcolor=#FF66FF align="center" |
|align=left|PS / PTP / PND / BE 
|2,157||0.04||—||1||1||—||0||—
|-
|style="width: 9px" bgcolor=#FF9900 align="center" | 
|align=left|Social Democratic / Earth Party
|1,897||0.04||—||2||3||—||0||—
|-
| 
|1,272||0.03||0.1||1||0||1||0||0
|-
|style="width: 8px" bgcolor=#005FAD align="center" |
|align=left|PPM / PPV
|856||0.02||—||1||0||—||0||—
|-
| 
|455||0.01||0.0||1||0||0||0||0
|-
|style="width: 10px" bgcolor=#000080 align="center" | 
|align=left|Portugal Pro-Life
|338||0.01||—||1||0||—||0||—
|-
|colspan=2 align=left style="background-color:#E9E9E9"|Total valid
|width="65" align="right" style="background-color:#E9E9E9"|4,657,329
|width="40" align="right" style="background-color:#E9E9E9"|93.18
|width="40" align="right" style="background-color:#E9E9E9"|3.8
|width="40" align="right" style="background-color:#E9E9E9"|—
|width="45" align="right" style="background-color:#E9E9E9"|2,086
|width="45" align="right" style="background-color:#E9E9E9"|8
|width="45" align="right" style="background-color:#E9E9E9"|308
|width="45" align="right" style="background-color:#E9E9E9"|0
|-
|colspan=2|Blank ballots
|193,471||3.87||2.2||colspan=5 rowspan=3|
|-
|colspan=2|Invalid ballots
|147,205||2.95||1.7
|-
|colspan=2 align=left style="background-color:#E9E9E9"|Total (turnout 52.60%)
|width="65" align="right" style="background-color:#E9E9E9"|4,998,005
|width="40" align="right" style="background-color:#E9E9E9"|100.00
|width="40" align="right" style="background-color:#E9E9E9"|6.4
|-
| colspan=11 align=left | Source: Autárquicas 2013 Resultados Oficiais
|}

Municipality map

Results by District

Aveiro

|-
! rowspan="2" colspan=2 style="background-color:#E9E9E9" align=left|Parties
! rowspan="2" style="background-color:#E9E9E9" align=right|Votes
! rowspan="2" style="background-color:#E9E9E9" align=right|%
! rowspan="2" style="background-color:#E9E9E9" align=right|±pp swing
! rowspan="2" style="background-color:#E9E9E9" align=right|Candidacies
! colspan="2" style="background-color:#E9E9E9" align="center"|Councillors
! colspan="2" style="background-color:#E9E9E9" align="center"|Mayors
|- style="background-color:#E9E9E9"
! align="center"|#
! align="center"|±
! align="center"|#
! align="center"|±
|-
| 
|119,007||33.48||2.8||19||53||1||5||0
|-
| 
|114,943||32.34||4.1||15||56||6||9||2
|-
| 
|30,216||8.50||1.3||15||13||6||2||2
|-
|style="width: 9px" bgcolor=#FF9900 align="center" | 
|align=left|PSD / CDS–PP / PPM
|16,694||4.70||—||4||5||—||1||—
|- 
| 
|14,503||4.08||1.0||19||0||0||0||0
|-
|style="width: 10px" bgcolor=#FF9900 align="center" | 
|align=left|Social Democratic / People's Party
|12,152||3.42||6.2||2||6||8||1||0
|-
|style="width: 8px" bgcolor=gray align="center" |
|align=left|Independents
|11,835||3.33||1.5||4||5||1||1||1
|-
| 
|7,982||2.25||0.2||10||0||0||0||0
|-
|style="width: 9px" bgcolor=#FF9900 align="center" | 
|align=left|PSD/ CDS–PP / MPT / PPM
|3,475||0.98||—||1||3||—||0||—
|-
| 
|235||0.07||—||1||0||—||0||—
|-
| 
|123||0.03||—||1||0||—||0||—
|-
|colspan=2 align=left style="background-color:#E9E9E9"|Total valid
|width="65" align="right" style="background-color:#E9E9E9"|319,031
|width="40" align="right" style="background-color:#E9E9E9"|93.16
|width="40" align="right" style="background-color:#E9E9E9"|3.8
|width="40" align="right" style="background-color:#E9E9E9"|—
|width="45" align="right" style="background-color:#E9E9E9"|141
|width="45" align="right" style="background-color:#E9E9E9"|2
|width="45" align="right" style="background-color:#E9E9E9"|19
|width="45" align="right" style="background-color:#E9E9E9"|0
|-
|colspan=2|Blank ballots
|14,778||4.16||2.3||colspan=5 rowspan=3|
|-
|colspan=2|Invalid ballots
|9,527||2.68||1.5
|-
|colspan=2 align=left style="background-color:#E9E9E9"|Total (turnout 54.18%)
|width="65" align="right" style="background-color:#E9E9E9"|343,483
|width="40" align="right" style="background-color:#E9E9E9"|100.00
|width="40" align="right" style="background-color:#E9E9E9"|6.6
|-
| colspan=11 align=left | Source: Autárquicas 2013 Resultados Oficiais
|}

Beja

In Beja, despite gaining votes overall, the PS lost two mayorships to the CDU; Cuba, and the district's capital, Beja.

|-
! rowspan="2" colspan=2 style="background-color:#E9E9E9" align=left|Parties
! rowspan="2" style="background-color:#E9E9E9" align=right|Votes
! rowspan="2" style="background-color:#E9E9E9" align=right|%
! rowspan="2" style="background-color:#E9E9E9" align=right|±pp swing
! rowspan="2" style="background-color:#E9E9E9" align=right|Candidacies
! colspan="2" style="background-color:#E9E9E9" align="center"|Councillors
! colspan="2" style="background-color:#E9E9E9" align="center"|Mayors
|- style="background-color:#E9E9E9"
! align="center"|#
! align="center"|±
! align="center"|#
! align="center"|±
|-
| 
|36,702||44.50||1.7||14||39||1||6||2
|-
| 
|31,855||38.63||1.2||14||34||1||8||2
|-
|style="width: 10px" bgcolor=#FF9900 align="center" | 
|align=left|Social Democratic / People's Party
|5,257||6.37||4.3||11||2||2||0||0
|-
|style="width: 8px" bgcolor=gray align="center" |
|align=left|Independents
|2,465||2.99||2.4||3||2||2||0||0
|-
| 
|1,746||2.12||5.4||2||1||3||0||0
|-
| 
|704||0.85||0.9||3||0||0||0||0
|-
|colspan=2 align=left style="background-color:#E9E9E9"|Total valid
|width="65" align="right" style="background-color:#E9E9E9"|78,729
|width="40" align="right" style="background-color:#E9E9E9"|95.46
|width="40" align="right" style="background-color:#E9E9E9"|1.6
|width="40" align="right" style="background-color:#E9E9E9"|—
|width="45" align="right" style="background-color:#E9E9E9"|78
|width="45" align="right" style="background-color:#E9E9E9"|1
|width="45" align="right" style="background-color:#E9E9E9"|14
|width="45" align="right" style="background-color:#E9E9E9"|0
|-
|colspan=2|Blank ballots
|2,134||2.59||0.9||colspan=5 rowspan=3|
|-
|colspan=2|Invalid ballots
|1,607||1.95||0.7
|-
|colspan=2 align=left style="background-color:#E9E9E9"|Total (turnout 62.35%)
|width="65" align="right" style="background-color:#E9E9E9"|82,545
|width="40" align="right" style="background-color:#E9E9E9"|100.00
|width="40" align="right" style="background-color:#E9E9E9"|2.6
|-
| colspan=11 align=left | Source: Autárquicas 2013 Resultados Oficiais
|}

Braga

In Braga, the PS gained the mayorship in Amares (from an Independent) and Barcelos (from a PSD/CDS-PP/PPM joint list), but lost two other mayorships, in Vieira do Minho and the capital city of Braga (to a PSD/CDS-PP joint list in Viera do Minho and a PSD/CDS-PP/PPM joint list in Braga.)

|-
! rowspan="2" colspan=2 style="background-color:#E9E9E9" align=left|Parties
! rowspan="2" style="background-color:#E9E9E9" align=right|Votes
! rowspan="2" style="background-color:#E9E9E9" align=right|%
! rowspan="2" style="background-color:#E9E9E9" align=right|±pp swing
! rowspan="2" style="background-color:#E9E9E9" align=right|Candidacies
! colspan="2" style="background-color:#E9E9E9" align="center"|Councillors
! colspan="2" style="background-color:#E9E9E9" align="center"|Mayors
|- style="background-color:#E9E9E9"
! align="center"|#
! align="center"|±
! align="center"|#
! align="center"|±
|-
| 
|190,815||38.76||4.3||14||49||6||7||1
|-
|style="width: 9px" bgcolor=#FF9900 align="center" | 
|align=left|PSD / CDS–PP / PPM
|70,632||14.35||6.4||2||10||5||1||1
|-
|style="width: 10px" bgcolor=#FF9900 align="center" | 
|align=left|Social Democratic / People's Party
|60,578||12.31||0.0||5||19||3||2||1
|-
| 
|46,473||9.44||11.0||5||20||8||4||0
|-
|style="width: 8px" bgcolor=gray align="center" |
|align=left|Independents
|32,025||6.51||3.7||6||9||2||0||1
|-
|style="width: 9px" bgcolor=#FF9900 align="center" | 
|align=left|PSD / CDS–PP / MPT
|31,174||6.33||—||1||4||—||0||—
|- 
| 
|24,563||4.99||0.4||14||2||1||0||0
|-
| 
|4,937||1.00||1.6||5||0||0||0||0
|-
| 
|4,926||1.00||2.3||5||1||1||0||0
|-
| 
|2,381||0.48||—||3||0||—||0||—
|-
|style="width: 8px" bgcolor=#005FAD align="center" |
|align=left|PPM / PPV
|856||0.17||—||1||0||—||0||—
|-
| 
|299||0.06||0.1||1||0||0||0||0
|-
|colspan=2 align=left style="background-color:#E9E9E9"|Total valid
|width="65" align="right" style="background-color:#E9E9E9"|469,659
|width="40" align="right" style="background-color:#E9E9E9"|95.4
|width="40" align="right" style="background-color:#E9E9E9"|2.2
|width="40" align="right" style="background-color:#E9E9E9"|—
|width="45" align="right" style="background-color:#E9E9E9"|114
|width="45" align="right" style="background-color:#E9E9E9"|0
|width="45" align="right" style="background-color:#E9E9E9"|14
|width="45" align="right" style="background-color:#E9E9E9"|0
|-
|colspan=2|Blank ballots
|14,377||2.92||1.5||colspan=5 rowspan=3|
|-
|colspan=2|Invalid ballots
|8,267||1.68||0.8
|-
|colspan=2 align=left style="background-color:#E9E9E9"|Total (turnout 62.61%)
|width="65" align="right" style="background-color:#E9E9E9"|492,650
|width="40" align="right" style="background-color:#E9E9E9"|100.00
|width="40" align="right" style="background-color:#E9E9E9"|5.2
|-
| colspan=11 align=left | Source: Autárquicas 2013 Resultados Oficiais
|}

Bragança

Bragança was one of the few districts where the PS had a net loss in mayorships, losing the mayorships in Freixo de Espada à Cinta and Torre de Moncorvo, but also gaining the mayorship in Mogadouro.

|-
! rowspan="2" colspan=2 style="background-color:#E9E9E9" align=left|Parties
! rowspan="2" style="background-color:#E9E9E9" align=right|Votes
! rowspan="2" style="background-color:#E9E9E9" align=right|%
! rowspan="2" style="background-color:#E9E9E9" align=right|±pp swing
! rowspan="2" style="background-color:#E9E9E9" align=right|Candidacies
! colspan="2" style="background-color:#E9E9E9" align="center"|Councillors
! colspan="2" style="background-color:#E9E9E9" align="center"|Mayors
|- style="background-color:#E9E9E9"
! align="center"|#
! align="center"|±
! align="center"|#
! align="center"|±
|-
| 
|33,727||37.23||1.0||12||31||4||5||1
|-
| 
|32,477||35.85||4.5||8||26||7||6||1
|-
|style="width: 10px" bgcolor=#FF9900 align="center" | 
|align=left|Social Democratic / People's Party
|6,350||7.01||7.4||3||7||6||1||1
|-
| 
|5,225||5.77||0.6||6||3||1||0||0
|-
|style="width: 8px" bgcolor=gray align="center" |
|align=left|Independents
|3,308||3.65||1.5||1||1||2||0||0
|-
|style="width: 8px" bgcolor=#0093DD align="center" |
|align=left|People's Party / Social Democratic
|2,426||2.68||—||1||2||—||0||—
|-
| 
|1,824||2.01||0.2||12||0||0||0||0
|-
| 
|442||0.49||0.0||3||0||0||0||0
|-
|style="width: 8px" bgcolor=#0093DD align="center" |
|align=left|CDS–PP / MPT / PPM
|92||0.10||—||1||0||—||0||—
|-
|colspan=2 align=left style="background-color:#E9E9E9"|Total valid
|width="65" align="right" style="background-color:#E9E9E9"|85,871
|width="40" align="right" style="background-color:#E9E9E9"|94.78
|width="40" align="right" style="background-color:#E9E9E9"|1.9
|width="40" align="right" style="background-color:#E9E9E9"|—
|width="45" align="right" style="background-color:#E9E9E9"|70
|width="45" align="right" style="background-color:#E9E9E9"|2
|width="45" align="right" style="background-color:#E9E9E9"|12
|width="45" align="right" style="background-color:#E9E9E9"|0
|-
|colspan=2|Blank ballots
|2,403||2.65||1.1||colspan=5 rowspan=3|
|-
|colspan=2|Invalid ballots
|2,327||2.57||0.8
|-
|colspan=2 align=left style="background-color:#E9E9E9"|Total (turnout 60.14%)
|width="65" align="right" style="background-color:#E9E9E9"|90,827
|width="40" align="right" style="background-color:#E9E9E9"|100.00
|width="40" align="right" style="background-color:#E9E9E9"|3.2
|-
| colspan=11 align=left | Source: Autárquicas 2013 Resultados Oficiais
|}

Castelo Branco

|-
! rowspan="2" colspan=2 style="background-color:#E9E9E9" align=left|Parties
! rowspan="2" style="background-color:#E9E9E9" align=right|Votes
! rowspan="2" style="background-color:#E9E9E9" align=right|%
! rowspan="2" style="background-color:#E9E9E9" align=right|±pp swing
! rowspan="2" style="background-color:#E9E9E9" align=right|Candidacies
! colspan="2" style="background-color:#E9E9E9" align="center"|Councillors
! colspan="2" style="background-color:#E9E9E9" align="center"|Mayors
|- style="background-color:#E9E9E9"
! align="center"|#
! align="center"|±
! align="center"|#
! align="center"|±
|-
| 
|47,590||44.33||0.3||10||35||1||7||1
|-
| 
|29,351||27.34||13.7||9||22||9||4||1
|-
|style="width: 8px" bgcolor=gray align="center" |
|align=left|Independents
|11,182||10.41||—||4||5||—||0||—
|-
| 
|6,836||6.37||2.2||11||1||1||0||0
|-
| 
|2,528||2.35||1.1||8||0||0||0||0
|-
| 
|1,163||1.08||0.5||2||0||0||0||0
|-
|style="width: 9px" bgcolor=#FF9900 align="center" | 
|align=left|Social Democratic / Earth Party
|1,142||1.06||—||1||2||—||0||—
|-
|style="width: 10px" bgcolor=#CC0033 align="center" | 
|align=left|Labour
|331||0.31||—||1||0||—||0||—
|-
|colspan=2 align=left style="background-color:#E9E9E9"|Total valid
|width="65" align="right" style="background-color:#E9E9E9"|100,123
|width="40" align="right" style="background-color:#E9E9E9"|93.26
|width="40" align="right" style="background-color:#E9E9E9"|3.2
|width="40" align="right" style="background-color:#E9E9E9"|—
|width="45" align="right" style="background-color:#E9E9E9"|65
|width="45" align="right" style="background-color:#E9E9E9"|2
|width="45" align="right" style="background-color:#E9E9E9"|11
|width="45" align="right" style="background-color:#E9E9E9"|0
|-
|colspan=2|Blank ballots
|4,028||3.75||1.7||colspan=5 rowspan=3|
|-
|colspan=2|Invalid ballots
|3,215||2.99||1.4
|-
|colspan=2 align=left style="background-color:#E9E9E9"|Total (turnout 57.98%)
|width="65" align="right" style="background-color:#E9E9E9"|107,486
|width="40" align="right" style="background-color:#E9E9E9"|100.00
|width="40" align="right" style="background-color:#E9E9E9"|4.5
|-
| colspan=11 align=left | Source: Autárquicas 2013 Resultados Oficiais
|}

Coimbra

|-
! rowspan="2" colspan=2 style="background-color:#E9E9E9" align=left|Parties
! rowspan="2" style="background-color:#E9E9E9" align=right|Votes
! rowspan="2" style="background-color:#E9E9E9" align=right|%
! rowspan="2" style="background-color:#E9E9E9" align=right|±pp swing
! rowspan="2" style="background-color:#E9E9E9" align=right|Candidacies
! colspan="2" style="background-color:#E9E9E9" align="center"|Councillors
! colspan="2" style="background-color:#E9E9E9" align="center"|Mayors
|- style="background-color:#E9E9E9"
! align="center"|#
! align="center"|±
! align="center"|#
! align="center"|±
|-
| 
|89,884||42.24||4.5||17||61||5||12||3
|-
| 
|28,362||13.33||9.9||7||26||11||5||1
|-
|style="width: 9px" bgcolor=#FF9900 align="center" | 
|align=left|PSD / PPM / MPT
|18,946||8.90||—||1||4||—||0||—
|-
| 
|15,970||7.51||1.9||17||3||2||0||0
|-
|style="width: 10px" bgcolor=#FF9900 align="center" | 
|align=left|Social Democratic / People's Party
|13,966||6.56||0.4||5||12||0||0||2
|-
|style="width: 9px" bgcolor=#FF9900 align="center" | 
|align=left|PSD/ CDS–PP / PPM / MPT 
|8,918||4.19||—||4||4||—||0||—
|- 
|style="width: 8px" bgcolor=gray align="center" |
|align=left|Independents
|8,766||4.12||2.6||4||4||1||0||0
|-
|style="width: 9px" bgcolor=#FF9900 align="center" | 
|align=left|PSD / CDS–PP / PPM
|3,960||1.86||10.5||1||3||3||0||0
|- 
| 
|3,767||1.77||1.4||8||0||0||0||0
|-
| 
|2,260||1.06||1.8||5||0||0||0||0
|-
| 
|925||0.43||—||1||0||—||0||—
|-
| 
|838||0.39||—||2||0||—||0||—
|-
| 
|555||0.26||—||1||0||—||0||—
|-
|colspan=2 align=left style="background-color:#E9E9E9"|Total valid
|width="65" align="right" style="background-color:#E9E9E9"|197,117
|width="40" align="right" style="background-color:#E9E9E9"|92.64
|width="40" align="right" style="background-color:#E9E9E9"|3.9
|width="40" align="right" style="background-color:#E9E9E9"|—
|width="45" align="right" style="background-color:#E9E9E9"|117
|width="45" align="right" style="background-color:#E9E9E9"|0
|width="45" align="right" style="background-color:#E9E9E9"|17
|width="45" align="right" style="background-color:#E9E9E9"|0
|-
|colspan=2|Blank ballots
|9,777||4.60||2.5||colspan=5 rowspan=3|
|-
|colspan=2|Invalid ballots
|5,877||2.95||1.8
|-
|colspan=2 align=left style="background-color:#E9E9E9"|Total (turnout 53.86%)
|width="65" align="right" style="background-color:#E9E9E9"|212,926
|width="40" align="right" style="background-color:#E9E9E9"|100.00
|width="40" align="right" style="background-color:#E9E9E9"|6.5
|-
| colspan=11 align=left | Source: Autárquicas 2013 Resultados Oficiais
|}

Évora

The CDU won one of its most important victories in Évora, recapturing the district's capital city, and historic CDU stronghold, of Évora. The CDU had held the city from 1979 to 1997, when it was captured by the Socialists. CDU General Secretary Jerónimo de Sousa flew into Évora to celebrate with the city's incoming mayor, Carlos Pinto de Sá, on election night.

|-
! rowspan="2" colspan=2 style="background-color:#E9E9E9" align=left|Parties
! rowspan="2" style="background-color:#E9E9E9" align=right|Votes
! rowspan="2" style="background-color:#E9E9E9" align=right|%
! rowspan="2" style="background-color:#E9E9E9" align=right|±pp swing
! rowspan="2" style="background-color:#E9E9E9" align=right|Candidacies
! colspan="2" style="background-color:#E9E9E9" align="center"|Councillors
! colspan="2" style="background-color:#E9E9E9" align="center"|Mayors
|- style="background-color:#E9E9E9"
! align="center"|#
! align="center"|±
! align="center"|#
! align="center"|±
|-
| 
|32,153||38.50||4.4||14||30||4||6||2
|-
| 
|27,767||33.25||6.6||14||31||5||5||2
|-
|style="width: 8px" bgcolor=gray align="center" |
|align=left|Independents
|9,217||11.04||2.7||7||12||3||3||2
|-
|style="width: 10px" bgcolor=#FF9900 align="center" | 
|align=left|Social Democratic / People's Party
|5,384||6.45||4.8||4||3||1||0||0
|-
| 
|2,922||3.50||7.5||7||2||3||0||0
|-
| 
|991||1.19||0.1||2||0||0||0||0
|-
| 
|550||0.66||0.3||3||0||0||0||0
|-
|style="width: 8px" bgcolor=#0093DD align="center" |
|align=left|People's Party / Social Democratic
|340||0.41||—||2||0||—||0||—
|-
|colspan=2 align=left style="background-color:#E9E9E9"|Total valid
|width="65" align="right" style="background-color:#E9E9E9"|79,324
|width="40" align="right" style="background-color:#E9E9E9"|94.99
|width="40" align="right" style="background-color:#E9E9E9"|2.1
|width="40" align="right" style="background-color:#E9E9E9"|—
|width="45" align="right" style="background-color:#E9E9E9"|78
|width="45" align="right" style="background-color:#E9E9E9"|0
|width="45" align="right" style="background-color:#E9E9E9"|14
|width="45" align="right" style="background-color:#E9E9E9"|0
|-
|colspan=2|Blank ballots
|2,573||3.08||1.2||colspan=5 rowspan=3|
|-
|colspan=2|Invalid ballots
|1,615||1.93||0.8
|-
|colspan=2 align=left style="background-color:#E9E9E9"|Total (turnout 58.05%)
|width="65" align="right" style="background-color:#E9E9E9"|83,581
|width="40" align="right" style="background-color:#E9E9E9"|100.00
|width="40" align="right" style="background-color:#E9E9E9"|3.7
|-
| colspan=11 align=left | Source: Autárquicas 2013 Resultados Oficiais
|}

Faro

In Faro there was a massive upswing in support for the CDU, including having the only mayorship, Silves, that swung directly from the PSD to the CDU.

|-
! rowspan="2" colspan=2 style="background-color:#E9E9E9" align=left|Parties
! rowspan="2" style="background-color:#E9E9E9" align=right|Votes
! rowspan="2" style="background-color:#E9E9E9" align=right|%
! rowspan="2" style="background-color:#E9E9E9" align=right|±pp swing
! rowspan="2" style="background-color:#E9E9E9" align=right|Candidacies
! colspan="2" style="background-color:#E9E9E9" align="center"|Councillors
! colspan="2" style="background-color:#E9E9E9" align="center"|Mayors
|- style="background-color:#E9E9E9"
! align="center"|#
! align="center"|±
! align="center"|#
! align="center"|±
|-
| 
|65,434||36.71||4.7||16||51||2||10||3
|-
| 
|44,208||24.08||7.5||14||33||10||4||3
|-
| 
|20,919||11.74||5.7||16||8||7||1||1
|-
|style="width: 9px" bgcolor=#FF9900 align="center" | 
|align=left|PSD/ CDS–PP / MPT / PPM
|12,823||7.19||2.8||2||7||0||1||0
|-
| 
|7,707||4.32||0.3||9||2||1||0||0
|-
|style="width: 8px" bgcolor=gray align="center" |
|align=left|Independents
|6,534||3.67||2.7||7||2||1||0||0
|-
|style="width: 8px" bgcolor=#0093DD align="center" |
|align=left|CDS–PP / MPT / PPM
|4,082||2.29||—||2||1||—||0||—
|-
| 
|1,272||0.71||0.9||5||0||0||0||0
|-
|style="width: 8px" bgcolor=#0093DD align="center" |
|align=left|People's Party / Earth Party 
|730||0.41||—||1||0||—||0||—
|-
| 
|364||0.20||0.1||1||0||0||0||0
|-
|style="width: 10px" bgcolor=#000080 align="center" | 
|align=left|Portugal Pro-Life
|338||0.19||—||1||0||—||0||—
|-
|colspan=2 align=left style="background-color:#E9E9E9"|Total valid
|width="65" align="right" style="background-color:#E9E9E9"|164,602
|width="40" align="right" style="background-color:#E9E9E9"|92.71
|width="40" align="right" style="background-color:#E9E9E9"|3.3
|width="40" align="right" style="background-color:#E9E9E9"|—
|width="45" align="right" style="background-color:#E9E9E9"|104
|width="45" align="right" style="background-color:#E9E9E9"|2
|width="45" align="right" style="background-color:#E9E9E9"|16
|width="45" align="right" style="background-color:#E9E9E9"|0
|-
|colspan=2|Blank ballots
|8,318||4.67||1.9||colspan=5 rowspan=3|
|-
|colspan=2|Invalid ballots
|5,325||2.99||1.8
|-
|colspan=2 align=left style="background-color:#E9E9E9"|Total (turnout 47.57%)
|width="65" align="right" style="background-color:#E9E9E9"|178,312
|width="40" align="right" style="background-color:#E9E9E9"|100.00
|width="40" align="right" style="background-color:#E9E9E9"|9.1
|-
| colspan=11 align=left | Source: Autárquicas 2013 Resultados Oficiais
|}

Guarda

|-
! rowspan="2" colspan=2 style="background-color:#E9E9E9" align=left|Parties
! rowspan="2" style="background-color:#E9E9E9" align=right|Votes
! rowspan="2" style="background-color:#E9E9E9" align=right|%
! rowspan="2" style="background-color:#E9E9E9" align=right|±pp swing
! rowspan="2" style="background-color:#E9E9E9" align=right|Candidacies
! colspan="2" style="background-color:#E9E9E9" align="center"|Councillors
! colspan="2" style="background-color:#E9E9E9" align="center"|Mayors
|- style="background-color:#E9E9E9"
! align="center"|#
! align="center"|±
! align="center"|#
! align="center"|±
|-
| 
|41,150||39.72||6.8||13||36||3||6||2
|-
|style="width: 10px" bgcolor=#FF9900 align="center" | 
|align=left|Social Democratic / People's Party
|25,993||25.09||15.7||5||16||9||3||2
|-
| 
|19,937||19.24||13.3||9||25||9||4||2
|-
| 
|3,262||3.15||0.8||14||0||0||0||0
|-
| 
|2,441||2.36||0.4||6||2||2||0||0
|-
|style="width: 8px" bgcolor=gray align="center" |
|align=left|Independents
|2,231||2.15||1.0||3||3||2||1||1
|-
| 
|871||0.84||0.2||1||0||0||0||0
|-
| 
|576||0.56||0.4||1||0||0||0||0
|-
| 
|455||0.44||—||1||0||—||0||—
|-
|style="width: 10px" bgcolor=#CC0033 align="center" | 
|align=left|Labour
|279||0.27||—||2||0||—||0||—
|-
|colspan=2 align=left style="background-color:#E9E9E9"|Total valid
|width="65" align="right" style="background-color:#E9E9E9"|97,195
|width="40" align="right" style="background-color:#E9E9E9"|93.82
|width="40" align="right" style="background-color:#E9E9E9"|2.6
|width="40" align="right" style="background-color:#E9E9E9"|—
|width="45" align="right" style="background-color:#E9E9E9"|82
|width="45" align="right" style="background-color:#E9E9E9"|1
|width="45" align="right" style="background-color:#E9E9E9"|14
|width="45" align="right" style="background-color:#E9E9E9"|0
|-
|colspan=2|Blank ballots
|3,263||3.15||1.4||colspan=5 rowspan=3|
|-
|colspan=2|Invalid ballots
|3,144||3.03||1.3
|-
|colspan=2 align=left style="background-color:#E9E9E9"|Total (turnout 61.74%)
|width="65" align="right" style="background-color:#E9E9E9"|103,844
|width="40" align="right" style="background-color:#E9E9E9"|100.00
|width="40" align="right" style="background-color:#E9E9E9"|3.2
|-
| colspan=11 align=left | Source: Autárquicas 2013 Resultados Oficiais
|}

Leiria

|-
! rowspan="2" colspan=2 style="background-color:#E9E9E9" align=left|Parties
! rowspan="2" style="background-color:#E9E9E9" align=right|Votes
! rowspan="2" style="background-color:#E9E9E9" align=right|%
! rowspan="2" style="background-color:#E9E9E9" align=right|±pp swing
! rowspan="2" style="background-color:#E9E9E9" align=right|Candidacies
! colspan="2" style="background-color:#E9E9E9" align="center"|Councillors
! colspan="2" style="background-color:#E9E9E9" align="center"|Mayors
|- style="background-color:#E9E9E9"
! align="center"|#
! align="center"|±
! align="center"|#
! align="center"|±
|-
| 
|75,989||35.56||9.4||16||50||10||9||2
|-
| 
|71,804||33.60||0.1||16||43||5||6||2
|-
| 
|18,537||8.67||0.0||16||7||1||1||0
|-
| 
|14,849||6.95||1.8||15||5||1||0||0
|-
|style="width: 10px" bgcolor=gray align="center" |
|align=left|Independents
|7,131||3.34||2.0||6||4||4||0||0
|-
| 
|3,830||1.79||0.7||6||0||0||0||0
|-
| 
|430||0.20||—||1||0||—||0||—
|-
| 
|219||0.10||—||1||0||—||0||—
|-
|colspan=2 align=left style="background-color:#E9E9E9"|Total valid
|width="65" align="right" style="background-color:#E9E9E9"|192,789
|width="40" align="right" style="background-color:#E9E9E9"|90.22
|width="40" align="right" style="background-color:#E9E9E9"|6.0
|width="40" align="right" style="background-color:#E9E9E9"|—
|width="45" align="right" style="background-color:#E9E9E9"|109
|width="45" align="right" style="background-color:#E9E9E9"|3
|width="45" align="right" style="background-color:#E9E9E9"|16
|width="45" align="right" style="background-color:#E9E9E9"|0
|-
|colspan=2|Blank ballots
|12,649||5.92||3.5||colspan=5 rowspan=3|
|-
|colspan=2|Invalid ballots
|8,249||3.86||2.5
|-
|colspan=2 align=left style="background-color:#E9E9E9"|Total (turnout 50.39%)
|width="65" align="right" style="background-color:#E9E9E9"|213,797
|width="40" align="right" style="background-color:#E9E9E9"|100.00
|width="40" align="right" style="background-color:#E9E9E9"|7.0
|-
| colspan=11 align=left | Source: Autárquicas 2013 Resultados Oficiais
|}

Lisbon

The PS and CDU both won key victories in Lisbon. The PS retained the district (and national) capital of Lisbon, with the best result ever achieved by any political party in Lisbon, and the CDU recaptured their historical stronghold of Loures from the PS.

|-
! rowspan="2" colspan=2 style="background-color:#E9E9E9" align=left|Parties
! rowspan="2" style="background-color:#E9E9E9" align=right|Votes
! rowspan="2" style="background-color:#E9E9E9" align=right|%
! rowspan="2" style="background-color:#E9E9E9" align=right|±pp swing
! rowspan="2" style="background-color:#E9E9E9" align=right|Candidacies
! colspan="2" style="background-color:#E9E9E9" align="center"|Councillors
! colspan="2" style="background-color:#E9E9E9" align="center"|Mayors
|- style="background-color:#E9E9E9"
! align="center"|#
! align="center"|±
! align="center"|#
! align="center"|±
|-
| 
|319,109||37.51||2.7||15||70||1||9||1
|-
| 
|133,033||15.64||3.2||15||27||8||2||1
|-
|style="width: 9px" bgcolor=#FF9900 align="center" | 
|align=left|PSD / CDS–PP / MPT
|68,101||8.01||—||2||6||—||0||—
|- 
|style="width: 8px" bgcolor=gray align="center" |
|align=left|Independents
|63,081||7.42||3.8||5||10||5||1||0
|-
| 
|49,076||5.77||1.6||5||19||2||2||1
|-
|style="width: 10px" bgcolor=#FF9900 align="center" | 
|align=left|Social Democratic / People's Party
|44,692||5.25||0.2||3||12||1||1||0
|-
| 
|34,907||4.10||0.5||10||0||0||0||0
|-
|style="width: 9px" bgcolor=#FF9900 align="center" | 
|align=left|PSD / MPT / PPM
|19,804||2.33||—||4||4||—||0||—
|-
| 
|9,902||1.16||0.6||7||0||0||0||0
|-
| 
|9,418||1.11||—||3||0||—||0||—
|-
|style="width: 9px" bgcolor=#FF9900 align="center" | 
|align=left|PSD/ CDS–PP / MPT / PPM
|7,253||0.85||14.1||2||4||11||0||0
|-
| 
|6,847||0.80||0.2||4||0||0||0||0
|-
|style="width: 8px" bgcolor=#0093DD align="center" |
|align=left|CDS–PP / MPT / PPM
|5,125||0.60||—||4||0||—||0||—
|-
|style="width: 8px" bgcolor=#005FAD align="center" |
|align=left|PPM / PPV / PND
|3,443||0.40||—||2||0||—||0||—
|-
|style="width: 10px" bgcolor=#CC0033 align="center" | 
|align=left|Labour
|3,172||0.37||0.3||7||0||0||0||0
|-
| 
|2,634||0.31||0.2||4||0||0||0||0
|-
| 
|1,272||0.15||—||1||0||—||0||—
|-
|colspan=2 align=left style="background-color:#E9E9E9"|Total valid
|width="65" align="right" style="background-color:#E9E9E9"|780,869
|width="40" align="right" style="background-color:#E9E9E9"|91.79
|width="40" align="right" style="background-color:#E9E9E9"|5.2
|width="40" align="right" style="background-color:#E9E9E9"|—
|width="45" align="right" style="background-color:#E9E9E9"|152
|width="45" align="right" style="background-color:#E9E9E9"|16
|width="45" align="right" style="background-color:#E9E9E9"|15
|width="45" align="right" style="background-color:#E9E9E9"|0
|-
|colspan=2|Blank ballots
|39,778||4.68||2.9||colspan=5 rowspan=3|
|-
|colspan=2|Invalid ballots
|30,014||3.53||2.3
|-
|colspan=2 align=left style="background-color:#E9E9E9"|Total (turnout 44.51%)
|width="65" align="right" style="background-color:#E9E9E9"|850,795
|width="40" align="right" style="background-color:#E9E9E9"|100.00
|width="40" align="right" style="background-color:#E9E9E9"|7.6
|-
| colspan=11 align=left | Source: Autárquicas 2013 Resultados Oficiais
|}

Portalegre

|-
! rowspan="2" colspan=2 style="background-color:#E9E9E9" align=left|Parties
! rowspan="2" style="background-color:#E9E9E9" align=right|Votes
! rowspan="2" style="background-color:#E9E9E9" align=right|%
! rowspan="2" style="background-color:#E9E9E9" align=right|±pp swing
! rowspan="2" style="background-color:#E9E9E9" align=right|Candidacies
! colspan="2" style="background-color:#E9E9E9" align="center"|Councillors
! colspan="2" style="background-color:#E9E9E9" align="center"|Mayors
|- style="background-color:#E9E9E9"
! align="center"|#
! align="center"|±
! align="center"|#
! align="center"|±
|-
| 
|28,368||43.32||1.7||15||37||2||6||0
|-
| 
|11,306||17.26||0.7||15||15||2||2||1
|-
| 
|10,115||15.44||7.8||11||22||1||6||0
|-
|style="width: 8px" bgcolor=gray align="center" |
|align=left|Independents
|5,662||8.65||3.4||4||4||0||1||1
|-
|style="width: 10px" bgcolor=#FF9900 align="center" | 
|align=left|Social Democratic / People's Party
|2,704||4.13||0.8||3||1||1||0||0
|-
| 
|1,599||2.44||1.4||4||1||1||0||0
|-
| 
|1,430||2.18||1.9||1||1||1||0||0
|-
|style="width: 9px" bgcolor=#FF9900 align="center" | 
|align=left|PSD / PPM
|686||1.05||—||1||0||—||0||—
|-
| 
|658||1.00||0.1||4||0||0||0||0
|-

|colspan=2 align=left style="background-color:#E9E9E9"|Total valid
|width="65" align="right" style="background-color:#E9E9E9"|62,528
|width="40" align="right" style="background-color:#E9E9E9"|95.48
|width="40" align="right" style="background-color:#E9E9E9"|1.8
|width="40" align="right" style="background-color:#E9E9E9"|—
|width="45" align="right" style="background-color:#E9E9E9"|81
|width="45" align="right" style="background-color:#E9E9E9"|0
|width="45" align="right" style="background-color:#E9E9E9"|15
|width="45" align="right" style="background-color:#E9E9E9"|0
|-
|colspan=2|Blank ballots
|1,599||2.44||0.8||colspan=5 rowspan=3|
|-
|colspan=2|Invalid ballots
|1,365||2.95||0.9
|-
|colspan=2 align=left style="background-color:#E9E9E9"|Total (turnout 63.14%)
|width="65" align="right" style="background-color:#E9E9E9"|65,561
|width="40" align="right" style="background-color:#E9E9E9"|100.00
|width="40" align="right" style="background-color:#E9E9E9"|3.6
|-
| colspan=11 align=left | Source: Autárquicas 2013 Resultados Oficiais
|}

Porto

|-
! rowspan="2" colspan=2 style="background-color:#E9E9E9" align=left|Parties
! rowspan="2" style="background-color:#E9E9E9" align=right|Votes
! rowspan="2" style="background-color:#E9E9E9" align=right|%
! rowspan="2" style="background-color:#E9E9E9" align=right|±pp swing
! rowspan="2" style="background-color:#E9E9E9" align=right|Candidacies
! colspan="2" style="background-color:#E9E9E9" align="center"|Councillors
! colspan="2" style="background-color:#E9E9E9" align="center"|Mayors
|- style="background-color:#E9E9E9"
! align="center"|#
! align="center"|±
! align="center"|#
! align="center"|±
|-
| 
|316,597||35.71||1.3||18||71||5||8||2
|-
|style="width: 10px" bgcolor=#FF9900 align="center" | 
|align=left|Social Democratic / People's Party
|130,219||14.69||12.7||7||29||10||4||0
|-
|style="width: 8px" bgcolor=gray align="center" |
|align=left|Independents
|125,325||14.14||4.0||11||18||3||2||2
|-
| 
|66,994||7.56||8.8||6||19||21||3||0
|-
|style="width: 9px" bgcolor=#FF9900 align="center" | 
|align=left|PSD / PPM
|61,840||6.98||—||4||18||—||1||—
|-
| 
|54,291||6.12||1.3||18||5||4||0||0
|-
|style="width: 9px" bgcolor=#FF9900 align="center" | 
|align=left|PSD / PPM / MPT
|24,366||2.75||—||1||3||—||0||—
|-
| 
|23,553||2.66||0.1||13||0||0||0||0
|-
| 
|14,198||1.60||0.1||9||1||0||0||0
|-
| 
|3,056||0.34||0.2||4||0||0||0||0
|-
|style="width: 10px" bgcolor=#CC0033 align="center" | 
|align=left|Labour
|2,130||0.24||—||4||0||—||0||—
|-
|colspan=2 align=left style="background-color:#E9E9E9"|Total valid
|width="65" align="right" style="background-color:#E9E9E9"|822,569
|width="40" align="right" style="background-color:#E9E9E9"|92.78
|width="40" align="right" style="background-color:#E9E9E9"|4.6
|width="40" align="right" style="background-color:#E9E9E9"|—
|width="45" align="right" style="background-color:#E9E9E9"|164
|width="45" align="right" style="background-color:#E9E9E9"|2
|width="45" align="right" style="background-color:#E9E9E9"|18
|width="45" align="right" style="background-color:#E9E9E9"|0
|-
|colspan=2|Blank ballots
|34,306||3.87||2.4||colspan=5 rowspan=3|
|-
|colspan=2|Invalid ballots
|29,705||3.35||2.2
|-
|colspan=2 align=left style="background-color:#E9E9E9"|Total (turnout 55.82%)
|width="65" align="right" style="background-color:#E9E9E9"|886,823
|width="40" align="right" style="background-color:#E9E9E9"|100.00
|width="40" align="right" style="background-color:#E9E9E9"|7.8
|-
| colspan=11 align=left | Source: Autárquicas 2013 Resultados Oficiais
|}

Santarém

|-
! rowspan="2" colspan=2 style="background-color:#E9E9E9" align=left|Parties
! rowspan="2" style="background-color:#E9E9E9" align=right|Votes
! rowspan="2" style="background-color:#E9E9E9" align=right|%
! rowspan="2" style="background-color:#E9E9E9" align=right|±pp swing
! rowspan="2" style="background-color:#E9E9E9" align=right|Candidacies
! colspan="2" style="background-color:#E9E9E9" align="center"|Councillors
! colspan="2" style="background-color:#E9E9E9" align="center"|Mayors
|- style="background-color:#E9E9E9"
! align="center"|#
! align="center"|±
! align="center"|#
! align="center"|±
|-
| 
|80,363||37.51||0.1||21||61||3||13||4
|-
| 
|36,667||17.11||12.3||12||23||10||4||1
|-
| 
|30,292||14.14||1.9||21||23||5||3||0
|-
|style="width: 10px" bgcolor=#FF9900 align="center" | 
|align=left|Social Democratic / People's Party
|19,220||8.97||4.9||6||12||5||1||0
|-
|style="width: 8px" bgcolor=gray align="center" |
|align=left|Independents
|15,430||7.20||1.1||11||8||2||0||0
|-
| 
|8,419||3.93||0.8||11||4||1||0||0
|-
| 
|4,578||2.14||0.3||11||0||0||0||0
|-
| 
|1,369||0.64||—||1||0||—||0||—
|-
|style="width: 9px" bgcolor=#FF9900 align="center" | 
|align=left|PSD / CDS–PP / MPT
|1,162||0.54||—||1||1||—||0||—
|- 
|style="width: 9px" bgcolor=#FF9900 align="center" | 
|align=left|Social Democratic / Earth Party
|755||0.35||—||1||1||—||0||—
|-
|style="width: 8px" bgcolor=#0093DD align="center" |
|align=left|People's Party / Earth Party 
|210||0.10||0.0||1||0||0||0||0
|-
|colspan=2 align=left style="background-color:#E9E9E9"|Total valid
|width="65" align="right" style="background-color:#E9E9E9"|198,465
|width="40" align="right" style="background-color:#E9E9E9"|92.62
|width="40" align="right" style="background-color:#E9E9E9"|4.1
|width="40" align="right" style="background-color:#E9E9E9"|—
|width="45" align="right" style="background-color:#E9E9E9"|133
|width="45" align="right" style="background-color:#E9E9E9"|0
|width="45" align="right" style="background-color:#E9E9E9"|21
|width="45" align="right" style="background-color:#E9E9E9"|0
|-
|colspan=2|Blank ballots
|8,906||4.16||2.3||colspan=5 rowspan=3|
|-
|colspan=2|Invalid ballots
|6,889||3.22||1.8
|-
|colspan=2 align=left style="background-color:#E9E9E9"|Total (turnout 53.68%)
|width="65" align="right" style="background-color:#E9E9E9"|214,401
|width="40" align="right" style="background-color:#E9E9E9"|100.00
|width="40" align="right" style="background-color:#E9E9E9"|6.3
|-
| colspan=11 align=left | Source: Autárquicas 2013 Resultados Oficiais
|}

Setúbal

|-
! rowspan="2" colspan=2 style="background-color:#E9E9E9" align=left|Parties
! rowspan="2" style="background-color:#E9E9E9" align=right|Votes
! rowspan="2" style="background-color:#E9E9E9" align=right|%
! rowspan="2" style="background-color:#E9E9E9" align=right|±pp swing
! rowspan="2" style="background-color:#E9E9E9" align=right|Candidacies
! colspan="2" style="background-color:#E9E9E9" align="center"|Councillors
! colspan="2" style="background-color:#E9E9E9" align="center"|Mayors
|- style="background-color:#E9E9E9"
! align="center"|#
! align="center"|±
! align="center"|#
! align="center"|±
|-
| 
|125,588||41.49||0.6||13||56||4||11||2
|-
| 
|78,909||26.07||2.1||13||36||1||2||2
|-
| 
|25,504||8.43||2.8||9||7||0||0||0
|-
| 
|16,694||5.51||1.1||11||2||1||0||0
|-
|style="width: 10px" bgcolor=#FF9900 align="center" | 
|align=left|Social Democratic / People's Party
|8,925||2.95||1.6||3||3||1||0||0
|-
|style="width: 8px" bgcolor=gray align="center" |
|align=left|Independents
|5,963||1.97||0.7||4||4||0||0||0
|-
| 
|5,804||1.92||2.4||9||1||1||0||0
|-
| 
|5,150||1.70||0.0||6||0||0||0||0
|-
| 
|3,562||1.18||—||4||0||—||0||—
|-
|style="width: 10px" bgcolor=#CC0033 align="center" | 
|align=left|Labour
|1,699||0.56||—||4||0||—||0||—
|-
|colspan=2 align=left style="background-color:#E9E9E9"|Total valid
|width="65" align="right" style="background-color:#E9E9E9"|277,798
|width="40" align="right" style="background-color:#E9E9E9"|91.77
|width="40" align="right" style="background-color:#E9E9E9"|5.1
|width="40" align="right" style="background-color:#E9E9E9"|—
|width="45" align="right" style="background-color:#E9E9E9"|109
|width="45" align="right" style="background-color:#E9E9E9"|4
|width="45" align="right" style="background-color:#E9E9E9"|13
|width="45" align="right" style="background-color:#E9E9E9"|0
|-
|colspan=2|Blank ballots
|13,736||4.54||2.7||colspan=5 rowspan=3|
|-
|colspan=2|Invalid ballots
|11,178||3.35||2.4
|-
|colspan=2 align=left style="background-color:#E9E9E9"|Total (turnout 41.67%)
|width="65" align="right" style="background-color:#E9E9E9"|302,767
|width="40" align="right" style="background-color:#E9E9E9"|100.00
|width="40" align="right" style="background-color:#E9E9E9"|7.9
|-
| colspan=11 align=left | Source: Autárquicas 2013 Resultados Oficiais
|}

Viana do Castelo

|-
! rowspan="2" colspan=2 style="background-color:#E9E9E9" align=left|Parties
! rowspan="2" style="background-color:#E9E9E9" align=right|Votes
! rowspan="2" style="background-color:#E9E9E9" align=right|%
! rowspan="2" style="background-color:#E9E9E9" align=right|±pp swing
! rowspan="2" style="background-color:#E9E9E9" align=right|Candidacies
! colspan="2" style="background-color:#E9E9E9" align="center"|Councillors
! colspan="2" style="background-color:#E9E9E9" align="center"|Mayors
|- style="background-color:#E9E9E9"
! align="center"|#
! align="center"|±
! align="center"|#
! align="center"|±
|-
| 
|55,148||37.50||4.2||10||30||5||6||0
|-
| 
|45,600||31.00||6.4||10||25||2||2||1
|-
| 
|19,021||12.93||0.1||4||7||1||1||0
|-
| 
|8,030||5.46||1.6||10||1||1||0||0
|-
|style="width: 10px" bgcolor=gray align="center" |
|align=left|Independents
|7,570||5.15||4.7||3||5||1||1||1
|-
|style="width: 8px" bgcolor=#0093DD align="center" |
|align=left|People's Party / Earth Party 
|1,991||1.35||—||1||0||—||0||—
|-
| 
|744||0.51||—||1||0||—||0||—
|-
| 
|659||0.44||—||1||0||—||0||—
|-
|colspan=2 align=left style="background-color:#E9E9E9"|Total valid
|width="65" align="right" style="background-color:#E9E9E9"|138,754
|width="40" align="right" style="background-color:#E9E9E9"|94.34
|width="40" align="right" style="background-color:#E9E9E9"|2.6
|width="40" align="right" style="background-color:#E9E9E9"|—
|width="45" align="right" style="background-color:#E9E9E9"|68
|width="45" align="right" style="background-color:#E9E9E9"|4
|width="45" align="right" style="background-color:#E9E9E9"|10
|width="45" align="right" style="background-color:#E9E9E9"|0
|-
|colspan=2|Blank ballots
|5,239||3.56||1.7||colspan=5 rowspan=3|
|-
|colspan=2|Invalid ballots
|3,087||2.10||1.0
|-
|colspan=2 align=left style="background-color:#E9E9E9"|Total (turnout 57.32%)
|width="65" align="right" style="background-color:#E9E9E9"|147,288
|width="40" align="right" style="background-color:#E9E9E9"|100.00
|width="40" align="right" style="background-color:#E9E9E9"|3.4
|-
| colspan=11 align=left | Source: Autárquicas 2013 Resultados Oficiais
|}

Vila Real

|-
! rowspan="2" colspan=2 style="background-color:#E9E9E9" align=left|Parties
! rowspan="2" style="background-color:#E9E9E9" align=right|Votes
! rowspan="2" style="background-color:#E9E9E9" align=right|%
! rowspan="2" style="background-color:#E9E9E9" align=right|±pp swing
! rowspan="2" style="background-color:#E9E9E9" align=right|Candidacies
! colspan="2" style="background-color:#E9E9E9" align="center"|Councillors
! colspan="2" style="background-color:#E9E9E9" align="center"|Mayors
|- style="background-color:#E9E9E9"
! align="center"|#
! align="center"|±
! align="center"|#
! align="center"|±
|-
| 
|54,731||40.74||1.7||14||42||3||8||2
|-
| 
|54,054||40.24||3.0||12||37||3||6||1
|-
|style="width: 8px" bgcolor=gray align="center" |
|align=left|Independents
|5,749||4.28||—||3||3||—||0||—
|-
| 
|4,242||3.16||0.6||14||0||0||0||0
|-
| 
|3,434||2.56||1.8||9||0||2||0||0
|-
|style="width: 10px" bgcolor=#FF9900 align="center" | 
|align=left|Social Democratic / People's Party
|2,870||2.14||5.9||1||2||9||0||0
|-
|style="width: 8px" bgcolor=#0093DD align="center" |
|align=left|People's Party / Social Democratic
|1,890||1.41||—||1||2||—||0||—
|-
| 
|603||0.45||0.3||1||0||0||0||0
|-
| 
|145||0.11||0.1||1||0||0||0||0
|-
| 
|29||0.02||0||1||0||0||0||0
|-

|colspan=2 align=left style="background-color:#E9E9E9"|Total valid
|width="65" align="right" style="background-color:#E9E9E9"|127,747
|width="40" align="right" style="background-color:#E9E9E9"|95.09
|width="40" align="right" style="background-color:#E9E9E9"|1.9
|width="40" align="right" style="background-color:#E9E9E9"|—
|width="45" align="right" style="background-color:#E9E9E9"|86
|width="45" align="right" style="background-color:#E9E9E9"|2
|width="45" align="right" style="background-color:#E9E9E9"|14
|width="45" align="right" style="background-color:#E9E9E9"|0
|-
|colspan=2|Blank ballots
|3,436||2.56||1.0||colspan=5 rowspan=3|
|-
|colspan=2|Invalid ballots
|3,161||2.35||0.9
|-
|colspan=2 align=left style="background-color:#E9E9E9"|Total (turnout 57.79%)
|width="65" align="right" style="background-color:#E9E9E9"|134,541
|width="40" align="right" style="background-color:#E9E9E9"|100.00
|width="40" align="right" style="background-color:#E9E9E9"|2.9
|-
| colspan=11 align=left | Source: Autárquicas 2013 Resultados Oficiais
|}

Viseu

|-
! rowspan="2" colspan=2 style="background-color:#E9E9E9" align=left|Parties
! rowspan="2" style="background-color:#E9E9E9" align=right|Votes
! rowspan="2" style="background-color:#E9E9E9" align=right|%
! rowspan="2" style="background-color:#E9E9E9" align=right|±pp swing
! rowspan="2" style="background-color:#E9E9E9" align=right|Candidacies
! colspan="2" style="background-color:#E9E9E9" align="center"|Councillors
! colspan="2" style="background-color:#E9E9E9" align="center"|Mayors
|- style="background-color:#E9E9E9"
! align="center"|#
! align="center"|±
! align="center"|#
! align="center"|±
|-
| 
|85,026||39.33||3.1||24||70||6||11||3
|-
| 
|63,998||29.60||12.9||15||52||17||10||1
|-
|style="width: 10px" bgcolor=#FF9900 align="center" | 
|align=left|Social Democratic / People's Party
|33,017||15.27||5.9||9||26||9||3||0
|-
| 
|9,689||4.48||0.3||14||2||0||0||0
|-
| 
|5,954||2.75||0.9||24||0||0||0||0
|-
| 
|2,607||1.21||0.2||6||0||0||0||0
|-
|style="width: 8px" bgcolor=gray align="center" |
|align=left|Independents
|2,393||1.11||0.1||2||2||2||0||0
|-
| 
|234||0.11||0.4||1||0||0||0||0
|-
|colspan=2 align=left style="background-color:#E9E9E9"|Total valid
|width="65" align="right" style="background-color:#E9E9E9"|202,918
|width="40" align="right" style="background-color:#E9E9E9"|93.86
|width="40" align="right" style="background-color:#E9E9E9"|3.1
|width="40" align="right" style="background-color:#E9E9E9"|—
|width="45" align="right" style="background-color:#E9E9E9"|152
|width="45" align="right" style="background-color:#E9E9E9"|0
|width="45" align="right" style="background-color:#E9E9E9"|24
|width="45" align="right" style="background-color:#E9E9E9"|0
|-
|colspan=2|Blank ballots
|7,270||3.36||1.9||colspan=5 rowspan=3|
|-
|colspan=2|Invalid ballots
|6,000||2.78||1.3
|-
|colspan=2 align=left style="background-color:#E9E9E9"|Total (turnout 57.03%)
|width="65" align="right" style="background-color:#E9E9E9"|216,465
|width="40" align="right" style="background-color:#E9E9E9"|100.00
|width="40" align="right" style="background-color:#E9E9E9"|5.4
|-
| colspan=11 align=left | Source: Autárquicas 2013 Resultados Oficiais
|}

Madeira

|-
! rowspan="2" colspan=2 style="background-color:#E9E9E9" align=left|Parties
! rowspan="2" style="background-color:#E9E9E9" align=right|Votes
! rowspan="2" style="background-color:#E9E9E9" align=right|%
! rowspan="2" style="background-color:#E9E9E9" align=right|±pp swing
! rowspan="2" style="background-color:#E9E9E9" align=right|Candidacies
! colspan="2" style="background-color:#E9E9E9" align="center"|Councillors
! colspan="2" style="background-color:#E9E9E9" align="center"|Mayors
|- style="background-color:#E9E9E9"
! align="center"|#
! align="center"|±
! align="center"|#
! align="center"|±
|-
| 
|47,207||34.81||17.2||11||33||14||4||6
|-
|style="width: 9px" bgcolor=#FF66FF align="center" |
|align=left|PS / BE / PND / MPT / PTP / PAN
|21,102||15.56||—||1||5||—||1||—
|-
| 
|17,679||13.04||4.7||9||8||4||1||1
|-
|style="width: 10px" bgcolor=gray align="center" |
|align=left|Independents
|16,738||12.34||7.7||4||9||6||2||2
|-
| 
|11,636||8.58||9.1||7||13||1||3||3
|-
| 
|7,243||5.34||0.8||11||1||0||0||0
|-
| 
|2,198||1.62||1.9||1||1||0||0||0
|-
|style="width: 9px" bgcolor=#FF66FF align="center" |
|align=left|PS / PTP / PND / BE 
|2,157||1.59||—||1||1||—||0||—
|-
| 
|1,657||1.22||—||3||0||—||0||—
|-
|style="width: 10px" bgcolor=#CC0033 align="center" | 
|align=left|Labour
|941||0.69||—||5||0||—||0||—
|-
| 
|516||0.38||2.2||5||0||0||0||0
|-
|colspan=2 align=left style="background-color:#E9E9E9"|Total valid
|width="65" align="right" style="background-color:#E9E9E9"|129,074
|width="40" align="right" style="background-color:#E9E9E9"|95.17
|width="40" align="right" style="background-color:#E9E9E9"|2.1
|width="40" align="right" style="background-color:#E9E9E9"|—
|width="45" align="right" style="background-color:#E9E9E9"|71
|width="45" align="right" style="background-color:#E9E9E9"|1
|width="45" align="right" style="background-color:#E9E9E9"|11
|width="45" align="right" style="background-color:#E9E9E9"|0
|-
|colspan=2|Blank ballots
|1,678||1.24||0.2||colspan=5 rowspan=3|
|-
|colspan=2|Invalid ballots
|4,870||3.59||1.9
|-
|colspan=2 align=left style="background-color:#E9E9E9"|Total (turnout 52.52%)
|width="65" align="right" style="background-color:#E9E9E9"|135,676
|width="40" align="right" style="background-color:#E9E9E9"|100.00
|width="40" align="right" style="background-color:#E9E9E9"|2.5
|-
| colspan=11 align=left | Source: Autárquicas 2013 Resultados Oficiais
|}

Azores

|-
! rowspan="2" colspan=2 style="background-color:#E9E9E9" align=left|Parties
! rowspan="2" style="background-color:#E9E9E9" align=right|Votes
! rowspan="2" style="background-color:#E9E9E9" align=right|%
! rowspan="2" style="background-color:#E9E9E9" align=right|±pp swing
! rowspan="2" style="background-color:#E9E9E9" align=right|Candidacies
! colspan="2" style="background-color:#E9E9E9" align="center"|Councillors
! colspan="2" style="background-color:#E9E9E9" align="center"|Mayors
|- style="background-color:#E9E9E9"
! align="center"|#
! align="center"|±
! align="center"|#
! align="center"|±
|-
| 
|56,977||46.62||0.3||19||62||4||13||2
|-
| 
|38,149||31.22||12.5||14||33||17||4||3
|-
|style="width: 10px" bgcolor=#FF9900 align="center" | 
|align=left|Social Democratic / People's Party
|7,810||6.39||—||2||4||—||0||—
|-
| 
|3,205||2.62||1.6||6||3||2||1||1
|-
|style="width: 9px" bgcolor=#FF9900 align="center" | 
|align=left|PSD / CDS–PP / PPM
|2,729||2.23||—||1||3||—||0||—
|- 
|style="width: 9px" bgcolor=#FF9900 align="center" | 
|align=left|PSD / PPM
|2,414||1.98||—||1||3||—||0||—
|-
| 
|2,105||1.72||0.0||8||0||0||0||0
|-
| 
|2,070||1.69||0.4||5||0||0||0||0
|-
|style="width: 8px" bgcolor=gray align="center" |
|align=left|Independents
|1,961||1.60||—||3||3||—||1||—
|-
|colspan=2 align=left style="background-color:#E9E9E9"|Total valid
|width="65" align="right" style="background-color:#E9E9E9"|117,420
|width="40" align="right" style="background-color:#E9E9E9"|96.08
|width="40" align="right" style="background-color:#E9E9E9"|1.7
|width="40" align="right" style="background-color:#E9E9E9"|—
|width="45" align="right" style="background-color:#E9E9E9"|111
|width="45" align="right" style="background-color:#E9E9E9"|2
|width="45" align="right" style="background-color:#E9E9E9"|19
|width="45" align="right" style="background-color:#E9E9E9"|0
|-
|colspan=2|Blank ballots
|3,086||2.53||1.3||colspan=5 rowspan=3|
|-
|colspan=2|Invalid ballots
|1,702||1.39||0.4
|-
|colspan=2 align=left style="background-color:#E9E9E9"|Total (turnout 54.01%)
|width="65" align="right" style="background-color:#E9E9E9"|122,364
|width="40" align="right" style="background-color:#E9E9E9"|100.00
|width="40" align="right" style="background-color:#E9E9E9"|2.8
|-
| colspan=11 align=left | Source: Autárquicas 2013 Resultados Oficiais
|}

Results by municipality
The table shows the results in the 20 District capitals plus Vila Nova de Gaia, Sintra, Oeiras and Matosinhos cities with over 100,000 inhabitants which are not district capitals.

References

2013 in Portugal
2013
Election results in Portugal